The UT Martin Skyhawks baseball team represents the University of Tennessee at Martin, which is located in Martin, Tennessee. The Skyhawks are an NCAA Division I college baseball program that competes in the Ohio Valley Conference. They began competing in Division I in 1993 and joined the Ohio Valley Conference the same season.

The UT Martin Skyhawks play all home games on campus at Skyhawk Baseball Field. Over their 27 seasons in the Ohio Valley Conference, they have played in four OVC Tournaments. The Skyhawks have yet to play in the NCAA Division I Tournament.

Since the program's inception in 1957, one Skyhawk has gone on to play in Major League Baseball, pitcher Alec Mills. Three other Skyhawks have been drafted.

Conference membership history (Division I only) 
1993–present: Ohio Valley Conference

Skyhawk Park 

Skyhawk Park is a baseball stadium on the UT Martin campus in Martin, Tennessee that seats 500 people. It opened in 1974.

Head coaches (Division I only) 
Records taken from the 2020 UTM baseball media guide.

Year-by-year NCAA Division I results
Records taken from the 2020 UTM baseball media guide.

Awards and honors (Division I only)

 Over their 27 seasons in the Ohio Valley Conference, 5 different Skyhawks have been named to the all-conference first-team.

Freshman First-Team All-Americans

Taken from the 2020 UTM baseball media guide. Updated March 9, 2020.

Skyhawks in the Major Leagues

Taken from the 2020 UTM baseball media guide. Updated March 9, 2020.

See also
List of NCAA Division I baseball programs

References